John Hartford Hoxie (January 11, 1885 – March 28, 1965) was an American rodeo performer and motion-picture actor whose career was most prominent in the silent film era of the 1910s through the 1930s. Hoxie is best recalled for his roles in Westerns and rarely strayed from the genre.

Early life
Born in Kingfisher Creek in Indian Territory (now the state of Oklahoma), Hoxie was the son of a veterinarian father, Bart "Doc" Hoxie, who was killed in a horse accident just weeks before Jack's birth, and a half–Nez Perce mother (some reports list her as Cherokee), Matilda E. Hoxie (née Quick). After his father's death, his mother and he moved to northern Idaho where, at an early age, Hoxie became a working cowboy and ranch hand. Matilda married a rancher and horse trader named Calvin Scott Stone. The family then relocated to Boise, where Hoxie worked as a packer for a US Army fort in the area, continuing to hone his skill as a horseback rider while competing in rodeos. In 1905, aged 20, he married Pearl Gage. The marriage lasted only a few months before the couple divorced.

In 1909, he met performer Dick Stanley and joined his Wild West show. He performed as bronco rider in the show. During this period, Hoxie met and married his second wife, Hazel Panting, who was a Western trick rider with the outfit.

Film career

Hoxie continued to tour with circuit rodeos until 1913, when he was approached to perform in the Western drama film short The Tragedy of Big Eagle Mine. Now billing himself as Hart Hoxie (a moniker he used until 1919), he continued working through the 1910s in popular Western shorts, often in small but well-received roles. In 1919, after appearing in roughly 35 films, he was cast in the starring role in the Paul Hurst-directed Lightning Bryce serials as main character Sky Bryce. Hoxie began billing himself as Jack Hoxie and used this name thereafter. He met and married his third wife, actress and frequent co-star Marin Sais, after his divorce from Hazel Panting. Although he rarely strayed from the Western film genre, several notable exceptions include his role as Perrone in the 1916 historical drama The Dumb Girl of Portici, starring Anna Pavlova; a role in the 1916 epic drama film Joan the Woman starring Geraldine Farrar; and his role as Sandusky in the 1917 drama Nan of Music Mountain, starring Wallace Reid and Ann Little.

Through the early 1920s, Hoxie became an extremely popular Western film star and worked for such film companies as Pathé Exchange, Arrow Film Corporation, and Sunset Pictures. In 1923, Universal Pictures head Carl Laemmle put Hoxie under contract and soon his career was on par with those of other Western stars of the era: Art Acord, Harry Carey, and Hoot Gibson. He appeared in such high-profile films as 1923's Where Is This West? with newcomer Mary Philbin and 1924's Universal promotional film Hello, 'Frisco, alongside such popular actors of the era as Jackie Coogan, Norman Kerry, Barbara La Marr, Antonio Moreno, Anna Q. Nilsson, Bebe Daniels, and Rin Tin Tin. The film was designed to showcase Universal's roster of its most popular actors. Hoxie, often atop his horses Fender and Dynamite, starred alongside such actresses as Marceline Day, Alice Day, Helen Holmes, Louise Lovely, Lottie Pickford, and Fay Wray in Westerns throughout the silent era.

Also during this period, Jack's younger half-brother Al Stone began to appear with him in films. Al eventually became a successful actor in the Western genre after changing his name to Al Hoxie and appearing in a series of films by actor/director J.P. McGowan.

In 1926, Laemmle and Universal chose Jack to star as Buffalo Bill Cody in Metropolitan Pictures' The Last Frontier, co-starring William Boyd. The film proved enormously successful. In 1927, however, Hoxie became dissatisfied with his contract at Universal and refused to renegotiate for another stint at the studio. He continued throughout the late 1920s making films with lower-rank film studios. He made his last silent film, Forbidden Trail, in 1929, before pursuing further work in circuit rodeos, carnivals, and the Miller Brothers 101 Ranch Wild West Show.

Later life
During the 1930s, Hoxie made a brief comeback in films after signing a contract with low-budget studio Majestic Pictures. The films, however, did little to revive his acting career, so he once again hit the rodeo circuit. His last film appearance was in 1933's Trouble Busters with Lane Chandler, who had appeared alongside Hoxie in a number of earlier films.

Hoxie eventually divorced and married his fourth wife, Dixie Starr. The couple briefly operated the Broken Arrow Ranch, a dude ranch in Hereford, Arizona. After a fire consumed the ranch, Hoxie returned to Wild West shows, often billed as the "Famous Western Screen Star". Hoxie performed throughout the 1940s and well into the 1950s before finally making his last public appearance as a performer in 1959 for the Bill Tatum Circus.

Hoxie divorced Starr and married his fifth wife, Bonnie Avis Showalter, and the couple retired to a small ranch in Arkansas, then later moved to his mother Matilda's old homestead in Oklahoma. In his later years, Hoxie developed leukemia, and he died in 1965 at the age of 80. He was interred at the Willowbar Cemetery in Keyes, Oklahoma with the epitaph "A Star in Life - A Star in Heaven".

Selected filmography

 Captain Courtesy (1915) - Martinez
 The Diamond from the Sky (1915) - Matt Hardigan
 The Scarlet Sin (1915) - 'Bull' Morgan
 Fatherhood (1915) - Del Beasley
 The Dumb Girl of Portici (1916) - Perrone
 Secret Love (1916) - Minor Role
 A Youth of Fortune (1916) - Gardener
 The Three Godfathers (1916) - Sheriff Pete Cushing
 The Girl from Frisco (1916) - Santone / The Sheriff
 Joan the Woman (1916)
 The Further Adventures of Stingaree (1917)
 The Man from Tia Juana (1917, Short) - The Sheriff (uncredited)
 A Whirlwind of Whiskers (1917, Short)
 Jack and Jill (1917) - Cactus Jim
 Nan of Music Mountain (1917) - Sandusky
 The Bull's Eye (1917)
 The Wolf and His Mate (1918) - Donald Bayne, 'The Wolf'
 'Blue Blazes' Rawden (1918) - Joe La Barge
 Nobody's Wife (1918) - Jack Darling
 His Majesty, Bunker Bean (1918) - The greatest pitcher
 The Iron Test (1918)
 Johnny Get Your Gun (1919) - Bill Burnham
 The Love Call (1919) - Nick Horton
 The Valley of the Giants (1919) - Jules Rondeau
 Told in the Hills (1919) - Henry Hardy
 Lightning Bryce (1919) - Sky Bryce - aka Lightning Bryce
 Thunderbolt Jack (1920) - Jach Halliday
 Death Valley Kid (1920)
 A Man from Nowhere (1920) - Clay Norton
 Cyclone Bliss (1921) - Jack Bliss
 Dead or Alive (1921) - Jack Stokes
 Cupid's Brand (1921) - Reese Wharton
 The Sheriff of Hope Eternal (1921) - Drew Halliday
 Devil Dog Dawson (1921)
 The Broken Spur (1921) - 'Silent' Joe Dayton / Jacques Durand
 Hills of Hate (1921) - Nate 'Hate' Hammond
 The Double O (1921) - Happy Hanes
 Two-Fisted Jefferson (1922)
 The Desert's Crucible (1922) - Jack Hardy Jr. / Deerfoot
 The Desert Bridegroom (1922) - Jack Harkins
Barb Wire (1922) - Jack Harding
 The Crow's Nest (1922) - Esteban
 Back Fire (1922) - 'Lightning' Carson
 Riders of the Law (1922) - Jack Meadows
 The Forbidden Trail (1923) - Jack Merriwell / Col. Jim Merriwell
 Gallopin' Through (1923) - Himself
 Wolf Tracks (1923) - John Hastings
 Don Quickshot of the Rio Grande (1923) - 'Pep' Pepper
 Desert Rider (1923) - Jack Sutherland
 Where is This West? (1923) - John Harley
 Men in the Raw (1923) - Windy Watkins
 The Red Warning (1923) - Philip Haver
 The Man from Wyoming (1924) - Ned Bannister
 The Phantom Horseman (1924) - Bob Winton
 The Galloping Ace (1924) - Jim Jordan
 Ridgeway of Montana (1924) - Buck Ridgeway
 The Back Trail (1924) - Jeff Prouty
 Fighting Fury (1924) - Clay Hill Sr. / Clay Hill Jr
 The Western Wallop (1924) - Bart Tullison
 Daring Chances (1924) - Jack Armstrong
 Hello, 'Frisco (1924) - Himself
 The Sign of the Cactus (1925) - Jack Hayes
 A Roaring Adventure (1925) - Duffy Burns
 Flying Hoofs (1925) - Frank Moody
 Ridin' Thunder (1925) - Jack Douglas
 Don Dare Devil (1925) - Jack Bannister
 The Red Rider (1925) - White Elk
 The White Outlaw (1925) - Jack Lupton
 Bustin' Thru (1925) - Jack Savage
 Hidden Loot (1925) - Cranner
 Two-Fisted Jones (1925) - Jack Wilbur
 The Demon (1926) - Dane Gordon
 A Six Shootin' Romance (1926) - 'Lightning' Jack
 The Border Sheriff (1926) - Sheriff Cultus Collins
 Looking for Trouble (1926) - Jack William Pepper
 The Fighting Peacemaker (1926) - 'Peace River' Parker
 The Last Frontier (1926) - Buffalo Bill Cody
 The Wild Horse Stampede (1926) - Jack Tanner
 Red Hot Leather (1926) - Jack Lane
 Rough and Ready (1927) - Ned Raleigh
 The Western Whirlwind (1927) - Jack Howard
 The Rambling Ranger (1927) - Hank Kinney
 Grinning Guns (1927) - 'Grinner' Martin
 Men of Daring (1927) - Jack Benton
 The Fighting Three (1927) - Jack Conway
 Heroes of the Wild (1927) - Jack Hale
 Forbidden Trail (1929)
 Riding Fool (1929) ?
 Gold (1932) - Jack Tarrant
 Outlaw Justice (1932) - Panamint Jack
 Law and Lawless (1932) - Montana
 Via Pony Express (1933) - Buck Carson
 Gun Law (1933) - The Sonora Kid
 Trouble Busters (1933) - Tex Blaine

References

Sources
Hoxie Boys: The Lives and Films of Jack and Al Hoxie. by Edgar M. Wyatt, Wyatt Classics, Raleigh, NC. 1992.

External links 

Jack Hoxie at the Old Corral
Jack Hoxie at Silents Are Golden
Devil Dog Dawson - The only known footage surviving from this 1921 Hoxie film was the subject of a PBS History Detectives investigation
Lone Pine Silent Films

New York Times Movies
Jack Hoxie exhibit at the Cimarron Heritage Center

1885 births
1965 deaths
Deaths from leukemia
American male film actors
American male silent film actors
Male actors from Oklahoma
Male Western (genre) film actors
Deaths from cancer in Oklahoma
20th-century American male actors
Roping (rodeo)
Bronc riders